John Marshall Coleman (born June 8, 1942) is an American lawyer and Republican politician who served in both houses of the Virginia General Assembly during the 1970s. He was the first Republican elected as Attorney General of Virginia since Reconstruction (and of any ex-Confederate state since 1896) and served 1978–1982, although his later campaigns for Governor of Virginia and U.S. Senate proved unsuccessful.

Early and family life
Born in Staunton, Virginia to William Warren Coleman, a factory worker who had become a minister and his wife, Marguerite Louise Brooks. Coleman attended grammar schools during Virginia's Massive Resistance crisis. On January 15, 1952, he was shocked to find his father, who had become badly injured in an automobile accident the previous year, had committed suicide in their basement. Coleman finished his schooling nonetheless, graduating from the University of Virginia with a B.A., in 1964, and received his J.D. from the University of Virginia School of Law, in 1970. Between his studies in Charlottesville, Coleman served in the United States Marine Corps (1966–1969) during the Vietnam War, including 13 months in Vietnam.

He married Agnes Maureen Kelly of Staunton, and they had two sons before separating during his Senate campaign in 1975. After that divorce became final, Coleman married Nicols Compton Fox in 1977, but they separated in 1985 and later also divorced.

Career

Upon admission to the Virginia bar, Coleman practiced law, as well as nearly immediately ran for public office. One of the two Republicans elected in 1972 to represent District 15 (part-time) in the Virginia House of Delegates, O. Beverley Roller, resigned before the 1973 session. Coleman won the election to finish the term, so his legislative service began on November 29, 1972. He won re-election once before running (and winning) a seat in the Virginia Senate formerly held by fellow Republican H. Dunlop Dawbarn (before his resignation before the 1975 session and briefly held by Democrat Frank W. Nolen after the special election). The 15th District of the House of Delegates at the time included Augusta, Highland, and Bath Counties, as well as the cities of Staunton and Waynesboro. The 24th senatorial district between 1972 and 1980 included Augusta, Highland and Rockbridge counties, and the cities of Staunton, Waynesboro, Buena Vista and Lexington. Coleman resigned his Virginia Senate seat to run for Attorney General, and Democrat Nolan of Harrisonburg regained it in the resulting special election.

Virginia voters elected Coleman Attorney General of Virginia in 1977. He defeated Democrat Edward E. Lane, who Coleman pointed out during the campaign, had supported Massive Resistance. Coleman became the first Republican to hold the office since Reconstruction. While Attorney General, Coleman argued (and arguably lost) four cases before the United States Supreme Court. Jackson v. Virginia, 443 U.S. 307 (1979) was a unanimous decision concerning review of habeas corpus petitions; Supreme Court of Virginia v. Consumer's Union,  444 U.S. 914 (1979) overturned certain regulations of attorney advertising (and allowed the winner attorney's fees), and Richmond Newspapers, Inc. v. Virginia, 448 U.S. 555 (1979) upheld the right to open criminal trials under the First Amendment. Coleman also lost Hodel v. Virginia Surface Mining and Reclamation Association, 452 U.S. 264 (1981), but the decision was not unanimous and may have been overruled by the reasoning in Garcia v. San Antonio Metropolitan Transit Authority (1985).

As his term as Attorney General ended, Coleman won the GOP nomination for Governor of Virginia in 1981. However, Coleman lost to Democrat Charles S. "Chuck" Robb in the general election.

After his term as Virginia Attorney General ended (and Democrat Gerald L. Baliles succeeded to that statewide office), Coleman moved to northern Virginia to continue his private legal practice. He became a senior partner at a Washington DC law firm and Dwight C. Schar, a builder of luxury homes, became one of his clients. Schar persuaded Coleman to change firms, and he was a partner at the Tyson's Corner, Virginia office of Arent, Fox, Kintner, Plotkin & Kahn from 1985 until 1992. During this period, Coleman helped handle the merger of Schar's NV Homes with industry giant Ryan Homes, which created NVR, Inc., which was large enough to be in the Fortune 500.

While with Arent Fox and NV Homes, Coleman again ran for Virginia statewide office twice. In 1985, he sought the Republican nomination for Lieutenant Governor. However, he came in second in a five-way primary, losing to state Senator John Chichester, who later was defeated in the general election by Democrat L. Douglas Wilder.

In 1989, Coleman became the Republican nominee for governor, having upset the heavily favored former U.S. Senator Paul S. Trible, Jr., in the GOP primary. Coleman then lost a close election to Democrat L. Douglas Wilder, who became the first African-American ever elected governor of a U.S. state. Coleman had been leading in certain polls until two days before the election.

In 1994, Coleman ran for U.S. Senate as an independent, seeking to seize the middle ground between Democrat Chuck Robb (who had won election to the Senate in 1988), and the controversial GOP nominee, Oliver North. Coleman received the endorsement and support of Virginia's other U.S. Senator, Republican John Warner. However, he came in a distant third as Robb narrowly edged out North to win re-election. Coleman received only 11% of the votes cast, despite Warner's support and widespread dislike among voters for North (who had been convicted on three felony counts, later overturned, for his role in the Iran-Contra Affair) and Robb (who faced allegations of womanizing). Former First Lady Nancy Reagan openly opposed North in the election.

Coleman returned to private practice with Katten Muchin & Zavis, and managed the firm's Washington DC office from 1994 until 1996, when (already a major stockholder), he became chairman of the Board of Directors of The Fortress Group, Inc., where he remained as of 1999.

References

External links

|-

|-

|-

|-

1942 births
Living people
Virginia Attorneys General
Virginia lawyers
Virginia Republicans
University of Virginia alumni
Politicians from Staunton, Virginia
Military personnel from Virginia
Members of the Virginia House of Delegates
Virginia state senators
University of Virginia School of Law alumni
United States Marines
Virginia Independents
United States Marine Corps personnel of the Vietnam War
Candidates in the 1981 United States elections
Candidates in the 1989 United States elections
20th-century American lawyers
20th-century American politicians